The following is a list of prominent people who were born in/lived in or around the city of Barisal as well as Barisal division in Bangladesh.

Government and politics

 Abul Hasanat Abdullah, politician, former Chief Whip (Bangladesh)
 Serniabat Sadiq Abdullah, Mayor of Barisal
 Hafizuddin Ahmed, Bir Bikrom, politician, former Minister of Water Resources, former Minister of Commerce 
 Amir Hossain Amu, politician, former Minister of Industries
 Mirza Agha Baqer, Mughal jagirdar after whom Bakerganj was named after
 Abdur Rahman Biswas, President of Bangladesh (1991–1996)
 Mohammad Ali Bogra, (1909-1963), Bengali politician, 3rd Prime Minister of Pakistan
 Gurudas Dasgupta, member of the Indian Parliament
 Priya Ranjan Dasmunsi, noted Congress politician, former Union Minister and member of the 14th Lok Sabha of India. He represented the Raiganj of West Bengal and was a member of the Indian National Congress party.
 Dr. Kamal Hossain, lawyer and politician, 1st Law Minister of Bangladesh, Creator of the Constitution of Bangladesh.
 M Sakhawat Hossain, Election Commissioner of Bangladesh (2007–2012)
Shawkat Hossain Hiron, Former Member of Parliament, Mayor of Barisal (2008-2013)
 Sher-e-Bangla A. K. Fazlul Huq, Prime Minister of Bengal (1937–1943), Chief Minister of East Bengal (1954) and Governor of East Pakistan (1956–1958)
 Syed Azizul Huq, politician and former Member of Parliament.
 Abdul Jabbar Khan, Speaker of the National Assembly of Pakistan (1965–1969)
 Khan Bahadur Hasem Ali Khan, Politician, lawyer, former cabinet minister.  peasant movement leader
 Sabi Khan, Mughal faujdar of Bakla
 Wazil Khan, governor of Bakla under Sultan Ruknuddin Barbak Shah
 Kazi Golam Mahbub, language movement activist and politician
 Jogendra Nath Mandal, One of the Founding Fathers of Pakistan, First Law Minister of Pakistan
 Jahangir Kabir Nanak, politician, former State Minister of Local Government, Rural Development and Co-operatives
 Shahjahan Omar, Bir Uttam, politician, former State Minister of Law
 Abdur Rahim, founding leader of Bangladesh Jamaat-e-Islami
 Nasreen Jahan Ratna, politician, former member of parliament
 Majibur Rahman Sarwar, politician, former Mayor of Barisal and former member of parliament for Barisal-5
 Delwar Hossain Sayeedi, vice-president of Bangladesh Jamaat-e-Islami
 Manikuntala Sen, revolutionary
 Abdur Rab Serniabat, cabinet minister

Art, literature, journalism, and philosophy

 Muhammad Reazuddin Ahmad, Islamic writer, journalist, and thinker.
 Jogesh Chandra Bagal, Indian journalist, historian and writer.
 Abdul Gaffar Choudhury, an author, columnist, lyricist.
 Asad Chowdhury, poet, writer, translator, radio, television personality and journalist,
 Jibanananda Das, Bengali poet, writer, novelist and essayist.
 Kusumkumari Das, poet, writer and social activist
 Mukunda Das,  Bengali poet, ballad singer, composer
 Narayan Gangopadhyay, writer and academic
 Buddhadeb Guha, writer
 Ahsan Habib, poet and journalist
 Abul Hasan, poet and journalist
 Shamsuddin Abul Kalam, writer
 Sufia Kamal, poet
 Tofazzal Hossain Manik Miah, founding editor of The Daily Ittefaq
 Aroj Ali Matubbar, philosopher
Ghulam Murshid, Bangladeshi author, scholar, and journalist, based in London
 Abu Zafar Obaidullah, Bengali poet and language movement activist
 Bazlur Rahman, journalist and editor of The Sangbad
 Kamini Roy, Bengali poet, social worker and feminist 
 Golam Sarwar, journalist and writer, founding editor of daily Samakal and Jugantor.
 Barun Sengupta, journalist, political critic, founder-editor of daily Bartaman

Entertainment

Film, television, theater, and radio

 Tania Ahmed, Television actress and model
 Atiqul Haque Chowdhury, media personality 
 Arundhati Devi, actress and director
 Utpal Dutt, actor, director, and playwright
 Alamgir Kabir (film maker), renowned film director and cultural activist
 Mosharraf Karim, Film and Television actor 
 Shahidul Islam Khokon, filmmaker and producer
 Golam Mustafa, Film actor
 Suborna Mustafa, Film and Television actress
 Sohel Rana, Film actor, director and producer
 Masum Parvez Rubel, Film actor
 Mir Sabbir, Television actor and director
 Omar Sani, Film actor 
 Hanif Sanket, television host, writer and producer, best known as the creator and host of popular television show Ittyadi
 Nikhil Sen, dramatist

Singers and instrumentalists

 Anil Biswas, film song composer
 Nachiketa Chakraborty, Indian musician
 Nikhil Ghosh, musician and teacher
 Pannalal Ghosh  renowned musician and flutist
 Parul Ghosh, playback singer
 Abdul Latif (musician), singer, musician, and lyricist. 
 Altaf Mahmud, musician and language movement activist
 Khalid Hassan Milu, singer
 Manabendra Mukhopadhyay, music composer and a famous singer of Nazrul geeti
 Papia Sarwar, singer

Performing arts

 Jewel Aich, renowned magician and bansuri player
 Laxman Das, wrestler, weight lifter, circus performer and the founder of Royal Pakistan Circus

Educationist and reformers

 Abala Bose, educator and social reformer
Ashwini Kumar Dutta, Bengali educationist, philanthropist, social reformer.
 Sal Khan, American educator, mathematician and entrepreneur, Founder of Khan Academy

Freedom fighters and revolutionary 

 A. B. Bardhan, Indian politician, trade union leader and the former general secretary of the Communist Party of India (CPI)
 Kirtinarayan Basu, 17th-century Raja of Chandradwip who converted to Islam
 Kanai Chatterjee, Indian maoist ideologue, founder of the Maoist Communist Centre of India
 Gurudas Dasgupta, Indian politician and a leader of Communist Party of India
 Mohiuddin Jahangir, Bir Shreshto, Liberation War veteran
 Major M A Jalil, sector 9 commander during Bangladesh liberation war
 Mostafa Kamal, freedom fighter in Bangladesh liberation war
 Hayat Mahmud, feudal lord, commander and founder of Miah Bari Mosque
 Niranjan Sengupta, revolutionary
 Tarakeswar Sengupta, revolutionary

Science and academia

 Swadesh Bose, Bengali language movement activist and economist
 Basudeb DasSarma, chemist
 Kadambini Ganguly, first South Asian female physician, social activist
 Biswajit Ghosh,  professor, essayist and researcher
 Debaprasad Ghosh, Indian mathematician and politician
 Ranajit Guha, historian of the Indian subcontinent and founding member of the Subaltern Studies Group 
 Hiranmay Sen Gupta, nuclear physicist
 A. M. Harun-ar-Rashid, physicist and professor of physics at the University of Dhaka
 Ehsan Hoque, medical doctor and philanthropist
 Sardar Fazlul Karim, scholar, academic, philosopher and essayist
 Nazia Khanum, academic and management consultant
 Amal Kumar Raychaudhuri, physicist, known for his research in general relativity and cosmology
 Hem Chandra Raychaudhuri, historian
 Tapan Raychaudhuri, historian
 Sukharanjan Samaddar, professor, educationalist, and martyred freedom fighter in the Bangladesh Liberation War
 Kaliprasanna Vidyaratna, Indian scholar of Sanskrit

Religious leaders

Islam

 Nesaruddin Ahmad (1873–1952), inaugural Pir of Sarsina and founder of Darussunnat Kamil Madrasa
 Ayub Ali (1919–1995), former Principal of Government Madrasah-e-Alia, Dhaka
 Fazlul Karim (1935–2006), former Pir of Charmonai and founder of Islami Andolan
 Rezaul Karim (born 1971), current Pir of Charmonai and leader of Islami Andolan
 Syed Faizul Karim (born 1973), senior vice-president of Islami Andolan
 Maqsudullah (1883–1961), inaugural Pir of Talgasia and founder of Ashraful Uloom Madrasa
 Abu Zafar Mohammad Saleh (1915–1990), former Pir of Sarsina and Independence Award recipient

Other

 Edith Langridge aka Mother Edith - led the Sisterhood of the Epiphany in Barisal
 Boro Maa, Hindu leader and a matriarch of the Matua Mahasangha

Sports

 Zahid Hasan Ameli, footballer
 Sukalyan Ghosh Dastidar, Indian footballer of the 1970s
 Sohag Gazi, cricketer
 Alamgir Hasan, footballer
 Mehidy Hasan, cricketer
 Salman Hossain, cricketer
 Tanvir Islam, cricketer
 Golam Kabir, cricketer
 Golam Kibria, cricketer
 Mohammad Manik, cricketer
 Zakaria Masud, cricketer
 Shahriar Nafees, cricketer
 Kamrul Islam Rabbi, cricketer
 Paresh Lal Roy, Father of Indian Boxing
 Golam Sarwar Tipu, footballer

References

People from Barisal Division
Barisal
Barisal